Sibirskiye Ogni is a rural locality (a settlement) and the administrative center of Pavlozavodsky Selsoviet, Pavlovsky District, Altai Krai, Russia. The population was 1,097 as of 2013. There are 14 streets.

Geography 
Sibirskiye Ogni is located 8 km southeast of Pavlovsk (the district's administrative centre) by road. Pavlovsk is the nearest rural locality.

References 

Rural localities in Pavlovsky District, Altai Krai